Manès Sperber (12 December 1905 – 5 February 1984) was an Austrian-French novelist, essayist and psychologist. He also wrote under the pseudonyms Jan Heger and N.A. Menlos.

Early life
Sperber was born on 12 December 1905 in Zabłotów near Kolomea, in the Austrian Galicia (today Zabolotiv, Ukraine). Sperber grew up in the shtetl of Zabłotów in a Hasidic family. He was the son of David Mechel Sperber and the older brother of Milo Sperber born 1911, who was to become an actor in Britain.

In the summer of 1916 the family fled from war to Vienna, where Sperber who, having lost faith, at 13 had refused to do his bar mitzvah, joined the Jewish Hashomer Hatzair youth movement. There he met Alfred Adler, the founder of individual psychology, and became a student and co-worker. Adler broke with him in 1932 because of differences in opinion about the connection of individual psychology and Marxism.

In 1927 Sperber had moved to Berlin and joined the Communist Party. He lectured at the Berliner Gesellschaft für Individualpsychologie, an institute for individual psychology in Berlin.

After Hitler had taken power Sperber was taken to jail, but was released after a few weeks on the grounds that he was an Austrian citizen. He emigrated first to Yugoslavia and then in 1934 to Paris where he worked for the Communist International with Willi Münzenberg. In 1938 he left the party because of the Stalinist purges within the party. In his writing he started to deal with totalitarianism and the role of the individual within society (Zur Analyse der Tyrannis).

In 1939 Sperber volunteered for the French Army. After the defeat, he took refuge in Cagnes, in the so-called "zone libre" (free zone) of France, and had to flee with his family to Switzerland in 1942, when the deportation of Jews started in that zone too.

Career
After the end of the war, in 1945, he returned to Paris, and worked as a writer and as a senior editor at the Calmann-Lévy publishing house.

Manès Sperber is the author of a novel trilogy: Like a Tear in the Ocean: A Trilogy, (1949–1955); of an autobiographical trilogy: All our Yesterdays (1974–1997), and numerous essays on philosophy, politics, literature, and psychology. Sperber was widely published and read in Germany, receiving the high-profile Friedenspreis des Deutschen Buchhandels in 1983. In awarding the prize, the association described Sperber as a "writer, who tracked the path of the ideological aberrations of the century, and freed himself from them entirely. Throughout his life he retained the independence of his own judgement, and incapable of indifference, summoned the courage, to get himself onto that non-existing bridge that only opens up in front of those who step out over the abyss." The German writer Siegfried Lenz gave the speech highlighting Sperber's lifetime achievement.

One of his closest friends was the novelist Constantine Fitzgibbon who translated much of his work into English.

Personal life
Manès Sperber is the father of Italian historian Vladimir Sperber and French anthropologist and cognitive scientist Dan Sperber. His first wife, Miriam Sperber, eventually emigrated to Champaign, Illinois, and became a counselor at the Psychological and Counseling Center there.

His younger brother Milo was an English actor. Milo spent the last years of his life travelling around Britain reading from his brother's works.

Death
Manès Sperber died on 5 February 1984 in Paris. He was buried in the Montparnasse cemetery in Paris. 

In 1988, the city of Vienna dedicated a park in the Leopoldstadt quarter to Sperber.

Prizes 
 1967 Remembrance Award from the World Federation of Bergen-Belsen Associations
 1971 Literature Prize of the Bavarian Academy of Fine Arts
 1971 Austrian Cross of Honour for Science and Art, 1st class
 1973 Hanseatic Goethe Prize
 1973 Honorary doctorate from the Sorbonne, in Paris
 1974 Literary Prize of the City of Vienna
 1975 Georg Büchner Prize
 1977 Franz Nabl Prize
 1977 Grand Austrian State Prize for Literature
 1979 Prix Européen de l'essai
 1979 Buber Rosenzweig Medal
 1983 Friedenspreis des Deutschen Buchhandels
 1983 Honorary Ring of Vienna

Works
Charlatan und seine Zeit (1924, ver. 2004)
Alfred Adler (1926)
Zur Analyse der Tyrannis (1939)
Like a Tear in the Ocean: A Trilogy (3 volumes, reprinted by Holmes & Meier 1988)
Volume 1 - Burned Bramble (1949)
Volume 2 - The Abyss (1950)
Volume 3 - Journey Without End (1955)
The Wind and the Flame (Allan Wingate, 1951) trans. Constantine Fitzgibbon
Die Achillesferse (1960)
Zur täglichen Weltgeschichte (1967)
Alfred Adler oder Das Elend der Psychologie (1970)
Leben in dieser Zeit (1972)
Wir und Dostojewski: eine Debatte mit Heinrich Böll u.a. geführt von Manès Sperber (1972)
All Our Yesterdays (3 volumes)
Volume 1 - God's Water Carriers (1974)
Volume 2 - The Unheeded Warning: 1918-1933 (1975)
Volume 3 - Until My Eyes Are Closed With Shards (1977)
Individuum und Gemeinschaft (1978)
Sieben Fragen zur Gewalt (1978)
Churban oder Die unfaßbare Gewißheit (1979)
Der freie Mensch (1980)
The Encyclopœdia of Sexual Knowledge
Nur eine Brücke zwischen gestern und morgen (1980)
Die Wirklichkeit in der Literatur des 20. Jahrhunderts (1983)
Ein politisches Leben - Gespräche mit Leonhard Reinisch (1984)
 (1985) (Essay)
Der schwarze Zaun (1986) (Fragments of a novel)

Notes

External links

 Biography in German, with mp3 audio

1905 births
1984 deaths
Austrian emigrants to France
Austrian psychologists
Austrian male writers
Burials at Montparnasse Cemetery
Jews from Galicia (Eastern Europe)
French psychologists
Georg Büchner Prize winners
Jewish Austrian writers
People from Ivano-Frankivsk Oblast
Recipients of the Austrian Cross of Honour for Science and Art, 1st class
Recipients of the Grand Austrian State Prize
20th-century psychologists